Anne Lundmark (born 1949) is a Swedish orienteering competitor. She is Relay World Champion from 1976, as a member of the Swedish winning team. She won a bronze medal in the individual contest at the 1976 World Orienteering Championships, behind Liisa Veijalainen and Kristin Cullman.

References

1949 births
Living people
Swedish orienteers
Female orienteers
Foot orienteers
World Orienteering Championships medalists
20th-century Swedish women